Hemmatabad (also Romanized as Hemmatābād and Himmatābād) is a village in Ferdows Rural District, Ferdows District, Rafsanjan County, Kerman Province, Iran. At the 2006 census, its population was 510, in 134 families.

References 

دحاهدا

Populated places in Rafsanjan County